The Party of the Democratic Left (SDĽ) was a social-democratic political party in Slovakia from 1990 to 2004. It was founded in 1990 out of the Communist Party of Slovakia.

History 
At the party congress on 14 December 1991 in Trenčín, the congress adopted new party constitution and decided to leave federation of Communist Party of Czecho-Slovakia, due to disputes with the Communist Party of Bohemia and Moravia and changing situation in the Czech and Slovak Federative Republic. Congress reconfirmed Peter Weiss as party chairman.

From 1994 to 1997, SDĽ was a member of a coalition called "Common Choice" that gained 10.18% (18 seats) in the Slovak parliament. They did not form a part of the government. Since the 2002 elections, it has had no place in the Slovak legislature. It was a member of the Party of European Socialists and the Socialist International.

On 4 December 2004, the party membership voted to merge with Direction – Social Democracy from 1 January 2005. The latter party had broken off from the SDL five years earlier.

Election results

National Council

Name changes 
 Communist Party of Slovakia (succeeding Communist Party of Slovakia) (22. 11. 1990)
 Communist Party of Slovakia – Party of the Democratic Left (12. 2. 1991)
 Party of the Democratic Left (1. 2. 1992)

See also 
 Party of the Democratic Left (Slovakia, 2005)
 Politics of Slovakia
 List of political parties in Slovakia

References

External links 
 Official web site (in Slovak)

Political parties established in 1990
Political parties disestablished in 2004
Defunct political parties in Slovakia
Party of European Socialists member parties
Former member parties of the Socialist International
Social democratic parties in Slovakia
Direction – Social Democracy
1990 establishments in Slovakia
2004 disestablishments in Slovakia